Helton–Mayo Farm is a historic farm and national historic district located in Shawswick Township, Lawrence County, Indiana.  The house was built about 1837, and is a -story Federal style, hall and parlor plan brick dwelling.  It has a side-gabled roof and rear ell.  Also on the property are the contributing Midwest triple portal barn (c. 1835–1845), wellhouse, corn crib, buggy shed, garage (1920s), and round roofed barn (1950).

It was listed in the National Register of Historic Places in 1995.

References

Historic districts on the National Register of Historic Places in Indiana
Farms on the National Register of Historic Places in Indiana
Federal architecture in Indiana
Houses completed in 1837
Historic districts in Lawrence County, Indiana
National Register of Historic Places in Lawrence County, Indiana